Mormula philippiana is a species of sea snail, a marine gastropod mollusk in the family Pyramidellidae, the pyrams and their allies.

References

 Okutani T., ed. (2000) Marine mollusks in Japan. Tokai University Press. 1173 pp. page(s): 705

External links
 To World Register of Marine Species
 Odé H. (1998) Indo-Pacific taxa of turbonillids, excluding those along the Americas. Texas Conchologist 34(2): 33-103.

Pyramidellidae
Gastropods described in 1860